Strepsicrates sideritis is a species of moth in the family Tortricidae first described by Edward Meyrick in 1905. This species is endemic to New Zealand. The classification of this moth within the genus Strepsicrates is regarded as unsatisfactory and in need of revision. As such this species is currently also known as Strepsicrates (s.l.) sideritis.

References

Tortricidae
Moths of New Zealand
Moths described in 1905
Endemic fauna of New Zealand
Taxa named by Edward Meyrick
Endemic moths of New Zealand